Mercédesz Stieber (born 4 September 1974 in Budapest) is a water polo player from Hungary, who competed for her native country at the 2004 Summer Olympics in Athens, Greece and Beijing 2008. She won the 1994 and 2005 World Championships and the 1991 and 2001 European Championships.

At club level she has played in Hungary and Italy for Budapest Honvéd, Orvosegyetem SC, Szentesi VK (1992–96), Gifa Palermo (1996–01), Orizzonte Catania (2001–03), Pescara (2003–04), Fiorentina (2004–09) and RN Imperia, where she currently serves as a player-coach. She has won three European Cups with Szentesi, Catania and Fiorentina; two LEN Trophies with Palermo and Imperia; three Hungarian championships; and three Italian championships.

See also
 List of world champions in women's water polo
 List of World Aquatics Championships medalists in water polo

References
 Profile

External links
 

1974 births
Living people
Hungarian female water polo players
Olympic water polo players of Hungary
Water polo players at the 2004 Summer Olympics
Water polo players at the 2008 Summer Olympics
Water polo players from Budapest
World Aquatics Championships medalists in water polo
20th-century Hungarian women
21st-century Hungarian women